Atocha may refer to:

Places
 Atocha (Madrid), a central ward (barrio) of Madrid, Spain, in the Arganzuela District
 Atocha (Salta), a municipality in Salta Province, Argentina
 Atocha, Bolivia, a town in the Atocha Municipality in Bolivia.
 Atocha Municipality, a municipality of Sud Chichas Province, Potosí Department, Bolivia
Atocha, Ecuador, a parish in Ambato, Ecuador

Other
 esparto or Atocha, a perennial grass in northwest Africa and the southern part of the Iberian Peninsula
 Madrid Atocha railway station, a central railway station of Madrid
 Estación del Arte (Madrid Metro), a station on the Madrid Metro previously named Atocha
 , a Spanish ship
 Santo Niño de Atocha, a representation of Jesus venerated by Hispanic Catholics
 Basilica of Nuestra Señora de Atocha
 Paseo Atocha, a historic commercial street turned promenade in Ponce, Puerto Rico
 Our Lady of Atoċja Chapel in Hamrun, Malta
 Atotxa Stadium, a football stadium in San Sebastián, Spain
 "Leaving the Atocha Station", 1962 poem by John Ashbery
 Leaving the Atocha Station, 2014 novel by Ben Lerner
 Puerta de Atocha (city gate), a former gate in the city walls of Madrid